Kings Avenue is a road in Canberra which goes between New Parliament House, across Lake Burley Griffin at the Kings Avenue Bridge, to Russell near the Australian-American Monument..

Route
It begins at State Circle around Capital Hill and forms the border between the suburbs of Parkes and Barton. It passes the National Archives of Australia, Robert Garran offices, Edmund Barton Building, Australian Centre for Christianity and Culture, Bowen Place and Kings Park. It ends at the intersection with Russell Drive.

Significant roads off it include: National Circuit; King George Terrace and King Edward Terrace within the Parliamentary Triangle; and, to the north of the Lake, Parkes Way, the major thoroughfare from the Canberra airport to the city.

The road was originally named Federal Avenue by the architect of Canberra, Walter Burley Griffin. Principal roads in Canberra are laid out in a geometrical pattern when viewed on a map. One of the predominant features forming this geometry is Capital Hill with major roads (Avenues) emanating radially  from it. Two of these roads form the Parliamentary Triangle incorporating bridges crossing Lake Burley Griffin. Walter Burley Griffin wanted to name these major avenues with grand names reflecting the reason for the creation of the city with the names Commonwealth Avenue and Federal Avenue. The government had different ideas; it renamed the road after the Sovereign at the time King George V.

The act of renaming the road from Federal Avenue to Kings Avenue gives rise to two interpretations of the name of Commonwealth Avenue. Rather than the name of the new nation "Commonwealth of Australia" and "Federal Avenue" for the federation of the states that formed that nation, the interpretation is now "Commonwealth Avenue" for the Commonwealth of British Colonies and "Kings Avenue" for the Sovereign of that Commonwealth, violating Griffin's original intent.

The speed limit on Kings Avenue is 60 km/h from the State Circle end to the southwestern side of Kings Avenue Bridge. The speed limit over the bridge and up to the Parkes Way overpass is 80 km/h.
 The avenue is a property on the Australian edition of board game Monopoly (game)

See also

References

Streets in Canberra